The Revolutionary Communist League was a small Trotskyist group in Britain.  It was founded in 1970 by two small groups, one who split from International Marxist Group, after failing to persuade the group to turn away from work in the student movement and towards the trade unions and entryism in the Labour Party, and one which had split from Militant.

The League promoted the Socialist Charter initiative of Tribunite Labour MPs which published the Chartist paper, and were consequently nicknamed the Chartists.  They took over this initiative, and based their work around the Charter on a conception of transitional politics taken from Leon Trotsky. They were also active around The Soldiers' Charter, an attempt to influence the armed forces.

By 1973 most of the group were moving to the right, while others (including Al Richardson) had left. A split developed and the Right of the group kept the journal, which developed a politics influenced by Euro-Communism and were close to the Labour Co-ordinating Committee.

In 1978 the RCL started to collaborate with the journal Intervention, which was connected to the Revolutionary Marxist Tendency, British section of Michel Pablo's International Revolutionary Marxist Tendency. Until 1980, the group moved away from Trotskyism towards a "distinctly libertarian type of socialism", focusing on advancing Socialist politics through municipal activity.

In late 1980, the Charist minority faction around figures such as Graham Bash and Keith Veness left the RCL to found the journal London Labour Briefing.

References

Defunct Trotskyist organisations in the United Kingdom
Political parties established in 1970
Entryists